Caret may refer to:

 A caret is a free-standing  character used in computing.
 Caret (proofreading), the proofreader's insertion symbols   
 Circumflex, the diacritic  in â, ê, î, ô, û.

Other
 CARET Brain Mapping Software
 Caret (surname), people with the surname Caret
 Caret or insertion point, a blinking vertical bar indicating where typed text will be inserted when using a cursor (user interface)
 Caret navigation (or caret browsing), a blinking vertical bar in a text field
 CARET, the beta-Carotene and Retinol Efficacy Trial

See also
 Philip L. Carret
 Carrot (disambiguation)
 Karat (disambiguation) (includes Karet)